Rivals for the World Record is a 1930 German sports film directed by Ernő Metzner and starring Bob Stoll, Liselotte Schaak, and Nien Soen Ling.

Cast

References

Bibliography

External links 
 

1930 films
Films of the Weimar Republic
1930s sports films
1930s German-language films
German black-and-white films
German auto racing films
Films about twin brothers
Films directed by Ernő Metzner
1930s German films